Paul Jordan is a Grand Prix motorcycle racer from Northern Ireland. He now competes in International Road Races aboard a Yamaha R6 and a Suzuki 1000 Superbike.

Career statistics

By season

Races by year

References

External links
 Profile on motogp.com

Motorcycle racers from Northern Ireland
Living people
1991 births
125cc World Championship riders